South Carolina Highway 261 (SC 261) is a  state highway in the U.S. state of South Carolina. It travels between Yauhannah in Georgetown County to Kershaw County. Although the highway covers more east–west distance, it is signed north–south.

Route description
SC 261 begins at U.S. Route 701 (US 701) at Yauhannah in Georgetown County. It travels westerly and then turns northward to end at US 521 north of Boykin in Kershaw County.

Three U.S. National Historic Landmarks—the Millford Plantation, Borough House Plantation and Church of the Holy Cross—are located on the highway in the High Hills of Santee region of Sumter County.

History

Major intersections

See also

References

External links

SC 261 at Virginia Highways' South Carolina Highways Annex

261
Transportation in Georgetown County, South Carolina
Transportation in Williamsburg County, South Carolina
Transportation in Clarendon County, South Carolina
Transportation in Sumter County, South Carolina
Transportation in Kershaw County, South Carolina